Missouri fiddling is a unique style and repertoire of traditional folk violin playing practised in the State of Missouri in the United States.

External links
Ozarks Fiddle Music By Drew Beisswenger, Gordon McCann

Music of Missouri
American folk music